Eivor Steen-Olsson (born 5 January 1937) is a Swedish orienteering competitor. She is two times Relay World Champion as a member of the Swedish winning team in 1966 and 1970.

She won a gold medal in the first official relay at the European Orienteering Championships, in Le Brassus in 1964, together with Ann-Marie Wallsten and Ulla Lindkvist.

She competed at the very first World Orienteering Championships, in Fiskars in 1966, where she won a gold medal in the relay together with Kerstin Granstedt and Gunborg Åhling, and placed fifth in the individual contest.

At the 1970 World Orienteering Championships in Friedrichroda she won a gold medal in the relay for Sweden again, this time with Birgitta Larsson and Ulla Lindkvist.

References

1937 births 
Living people
Swedish orienteers
Female orienteers
Foot orienteers
World Orienteering Championships medalists